Ko Young-hee (고영희) may refer to:

 Go Yeong-hui (born 1956), South Korean sports shooter
 Ko Yeong-hee (born 1980), South Korean speed skater

See also 
 Ko Yong-hui (고용희)